Medieval Greek (also known as Middle Greek, Byzantine Greek, or Romaic) is the stage of the Greek language between the end of classical antiquity in the 5th–6th centuries and the end of the Middle Ages, conventionally dated to the Ottoman conquest of Constantinople in 1453.

From the 7th century onwards, Greek was the only language of administration and government in the Byzantine Empire. This stage of language is thus described as Byzantine Greek. The study of the Medieval Greek language and literature is a branch of Byzantine studies, the study of the history and culture of the Byzantine Empire.

The beginning of Medieval Greek is occasionally dated back to as early as the 4th century, either to 330 AD, when the political centre of the Roman Empire was moved to Constantinople, or to 395 AD, the division of the empire. However, this approach is rather arbitrary as it is more an assumption of political, as opposed to cultural and linguistic, developments. Indeed, by this time the spoken language, particularly pronunciation, had already shifted towards modern forms.

The conquests of Alexander the Great, and the ensuing Hellenistic period, had caused Greek to spread to peoples throughout Anatolia and the Eastern Mediterranean, altering the spoken language's pronunciation and structure.

Medieval Greek is the link between this vernacular, known as Koine Greek, and Modern Greek. Though Byzantine Greek literature was still strongly influenced by Attic Greek, it was also influenced by vernacular Koine Greek, which is the language of the New Testament and the liturgical language of the Greek Orthodox Church.

History and development

Constantine (the Great) moved the capital of the Roman Empire to Byzantium (renamed Constantinople) in 330. The city, though a major imperial residence like other cities such as Trier, Milan and Sirmium, was not officially a capital until 359. Nonetheless, the imperial court resided there and the city was the political centre of the eastern parts of the Roman Empire where Greek was the dominant language. At first, Latin remained the language of both the court and the army. It was used for official documents, but its influence waned. From the beginning of the 6th century, amendments to the law were mostly written in Greek. Furthermore, parts of the Roman Corpus Iuris Civilis were gradually translated into Greek. Under the rule of Emperor Heraclius (610–641 AD), who also assumed the Greek title Basileus ('monarch') in 610, Greek became the official language of the Eastern Roman Empire. This was in spite of the fact that the inhabitants of the empire still considered themselves  ('Romans') until its end in 1453, as they saw their State as the perpetuation of Roman rule. Latin continued to be used on the coinage until the ninth century and in certain court ceremonies for even longer.

Despite the absence of reliable demographic figures, it has been estimated that less than one third of the inhabitants of the Eastern Roman Empire, around eight million people, were native speakers of Greek. The number of those who were able to communicate in Greek may have been far higher. The native Greek speakers consisted of many of the inhabitants of the southern Balkan Peninsula, south of the Jireček Line, and all of the inhabitants of Asia Minor, where the native tongues (Phrygian, Lycian, Lydian, Carian etc.), except Armenian in the east, had become extinct and replaced by Greek by the 5th century.

In any case, all cities of the Eastern Roman Empire were strongly influenced by the Greek language.

In the period between 603 and 619, the southern and eastern parts of the empire (Syria, Egypt, North Africa) were occupied by Persian Sassanids and, after being recaptured by Heraclius in the years 622 to 628, were conquered by the Arabs in the course of the Muslim conquests a few years later.

Alexandria, a centre of Greek culture and language, fell to the Arabs in 642. During the seventh and eighth centuries, Greek was gradually replaced by Arabic as an official language in conquered territories such as Egypt, as more people learned Arabic. Thus, the use of Greek declined early on in Syria and Egypt. The invasion of the Slavs into the Balkan Peninsula reduced the area where Greek and Latin was spoken (roughly north of a line from Montenegro to Varna on the Black Sea in Bulgaria). Sicily and parts of Magna Graecia, Cyprus, Asia Minor and more generally Anatolia, parts of the Crimean Peninsula remained Greek-speaking. The southern Balkans which would henceforth be contested between Byzantium and various Slavic kingdoms or empires. The Greek language spoken by one-third of the population of Sicily at the time of the Norman conquest 1060–1090 remained vibrant for more than a century, but slowly died out (as did Arabic) to a deliberate policy of Latinization in language and religion from the mid-1160s.

From the late 11th century onwards, the interior of Anatolia was invaded by Seljuq Turks, who advanced westwards. With the Ottoman conquests of Constantinople in 1453, the Peloponnese in 1459 or 1460, the Empire of Trebizond in 1461, Athens in 1465, and two centuries later the Duchy of Candia in 1669, the Greek language lost its status as a national language until the emergence of modern Greece in the year 1821. Language varieties after 1453 are referred to as Modern Greek.

Diglossia
As early as in the Hellenistic period, there was a tendency towards a state of diglossia between the Attic literary language and the constantly developing vernacular Koine. By late antiquity, the gap had become impossible to ignore. In the Byzantine era, written Greek manifested itself in a whole spectrum of divergent registers, all of which were consciously archaic in comparison with the contemporary spoken vernacular, but in different degrees.

They ranged from a moderately archaic style employed for most every-day writing and based mostly on the written Koine of the Bible and early Christian literature, to a highly artificial learned style, employed by authors with higher literary ambitions and closely imitating the model of classical Attic, in continuation of the movement of Atticism in late antiquity. At the same time, the spoken vernacular language developed on the basis of earlier spoken Koine, and reached a stage that in many ways resembles present-day Modern Greek in terms of grammar and phonology by the turn of the first millennium AD. Written literature reflecting this Demotic Greek begins to appear around 1100.

Among the preserved literature in the Attic literary language, various forms of historiography take a prominent place. They comprise chronicles as well as classicist, contemporary works of historiography, theological documents, and saints' lives. Poetry can be found in the form of hymns and ecclesiastical poetry. Many of the Byzantine emperors were active writers themselves and wrote chronicles or works on the running of the Byzantine state and strategic or philological works.

Furthermore, letters, legal texts, and numerous registers and lists in Medieval Greek exist. Concessions to spoken Greek can be found, for example, in John Malalas's Chronography from the 6th century, the Chronicle of Theophanes the Confessor (9th century) and the works of Emperor Constantine VII Porphyrogenitus (mid-10th century). These are influenced by the vernacular language of their time in choice of words and idiom, but largely follow the models of written Koine in their morphology and syntax.

Before the 13th century, examples of texts written in vernacular Greek are very rare. They are restricted to isolated passages of popular acclamations, sayings, and particularly common or untranslatable formulations which occasionally made their way into Greek literature. Since the end of the 11th century, vernacular Greek poems from the literary realm of Constantinople are documented.

The Digenes Akritas, a collection of heroic sagas from the 12th century that was later collated in a verse epic, was the first literary work completely written in the vernacular. The Greek vernacular verse epic appeared in the 12th century, around the time of the French romance novel, almost as a backlash to the Attic renaissance during the dynasty of the Komnenoi in works like Psellos's Chronography (in the middle of the 11th century) or the Alexiad, the biography of Emperor Alexios I Komnenos written by his daughter Anna Komnena about a century later. In fifteen-syllable blank verse (versus politicus), the Digenes Akritas deals with both ancient and medieval heroic sagas, but also with stories of animals and plants. The Chronicle of the Morea, a verse chronicle from the 14th century, is unique. It has also been preserved in French, Italian and Aragonese versions, and covers the history of Frankish feudalism on the Peloponnese during the Latinokratia of the Principality of Achaea, a crusader state set up after the Fourth Crusade and the 13th century fall of Constantinople.

The earliest evidence of prose vernacular Greek exists in some documents from southern Italy written in the tenth century. Later prose literature consists of statute books, chronicles and fragments of religious, historical and medical works. The dualism of literary language and vernacular was to persist until well into the 20th century, when the Greek language question was decided in favor of the vernacular in 1976.

Dialects
The persistence until the Middle Ages of a single Greek speaking state, the Byzantine Empire, meant that, unlike Vulgar Latin, Greek did not split into separate languages. However, with the fracturing of the Byzantine state after the turn of the first millennium, newly isolated dialects such as Mariupol Greek, spoken in Crimea, Pontic Greek, spoken along the Black Sea coast of Asia Minor, and Cappadocian, spoken in central Asia Minor, began to diverge. In Griko, a language spoken in the southern Italian exclaves, and in Tsakonian, which is spoken on the Peloponnese, dialects of older origin continue to be used today. Cypriot Greek was already in a literary form in the late Middle Ages, being used in the Assizes of Cyprus and the chronicles of Leontios Makhairas and Georgios Boustronios.

Phonetics and phonology
It is assumed that most of the developments leading to the phonology of Modern Greek had either already taken place in Medieval Greek and its Hellenistic period predecessor Koine Greek, or were continuing to develop during this period. Above all, these developments included the establishment of dynamic stress, which had already replaced the tonal system of Ancient Greek during the Hellenistic period. In addition, the vowel system was gradually reduced to five phonemes without any differentiation in vowel length, a process also well begun during the Hellenistic period. Furthermore, Ancient Greek diphthongs became monophthongs.

Vowels

The Suda, an encyclopedia from the late 10th century, gives some indication of the vowel inventory. Following the antistoichic system, it lists terms alphabetically but arranges similarly pronounced letters side by side.

Words with initial vowels were often affected by apheresis:   →   ('the day'),   →   ('(I) ask').

A regular phenomenon in most dialects is synizesis ("merging" of vowels). Thus:   →   ('Roman'),   →   ('nine'),   →   ('which'),   →   ('the children'). This accentual shift is already reflected in the metre of the 6th century hymns of Romanos the Melodist. This phenomenon is attested to have begun earlier, in the Hellenistic Koine Greek papyri.

Consonants
The velar sounds  were realised as palatal allophones before front vowels. The fricative , which had been present in Classical Greek, had been lost early on, although it continued to be reflected in spelling through the rough breathing, a diacritic mark added to vowels.

Changes in the phonological system mainly affect consonant clusters that show sandhi processes. In clusters of two different plosives or two different fricatives, there is a tendency for dissimilation such that the first consonant becomes a fricative and/or the second becomes a plosive ultimately favoring a fricative-plosive cluster. Medieval Greek also had cluster voicing harmony favoring the voice of the final plosive or fricative; when the resulting clusters became voiceless, the aforementioned sandhi would further apply. This process of assimilation and sandhi was highly regular and predictable, forming a rule of Medieval Greek phonotactics that would persist into Early Modern Greek.

The resulting clusters were:

For plosives:

 
  (  →  )
  (  →  )

For fricatives where the second was not :

  (  →  )
  (only occurred in Pontic Greek)
  (  →  )
  (  →  )
 
  (  →  )

For fricatives where the second was :

  (  →  )

The nasals  and  also disappeared before voiceless fricatives, for example   →  ,   →  .

A new set of voiced plosives ,  and  developed through voicing of voiceless plosives after nasals. There is some dispute as to when exactly this development took place but apparently it began during the Byzantine period.

Grammar
Many decisive changes between Ancient and Modern Greek were completed by  AD. There is a striking reduction of inflectional categories inherited from Indo-European, especially in the verbal system, and a complementary tendency of developing new analytical formations and periphrastic constructions.

In morphology, the inflectional paradigms of declension, conjugation and comparison were regularised through analogy. Thus, in nouns, the Ancient Greek third declension, which showed an unequal number of syllables in the different cases, was adjusted to the regular first and second declension by forming a new nominative form out of the oblique case forms: Ancient Greek   → Modern Greek  , in analogy to the accusative form  .

Irregularities in verb inflection were also reduced through analogy. The use of the past tense prefix, known as augment, was gradually limited to regular forms in which the augment was required to carry word stress. Reduplication in the verb stem, which was a feature of the old perfect forms, was gradually abandoned and only retained in antiquated forms. The auxiliary   ('be'), originally part of the same class, adopted a new set of endings modelled on the passive of regular verbs, as in the following examples:

In most cases, the numerous stem variants that appeared in the Ancient Greek system of aspect inflection were reduced to only two basic stem forms, sometimes only one.

One of the numerous forms that disappeared was the dative. In addition, nearly all the participles and the imperative forms of the 3rd person were lost. By the end of the Byzantine era, the construction   ('I want that…') + subordinate clause developed into  . Eventually,  became the Modern Greek future particle  , which replaced the old future forms. Ancient formations like the genitive absolute, the accusative and infinitive and nearly all common participle constructions were gradually substituted by the constructions of subordinate clauses and the newly emerged gerund.

The most noticeable grammatical change in comparison to ancient Greek is the almost complete loss of the infinitive, which has been replaced by subordinate clauses with the particle να. Possibly transmitted through Greek, this phenomenon can also be found in the adjacent languages and dialects of the Balkans. Bulgarian and Romanian, for example, are in many respects typologically similar to medieval and present day Greek, although genealogically they are not closely related.

Vocabulary, script, influence on other languages

Intralinguistic innovations
In everyday usage, some old Greek stems were replaced, for example, the expression for "wine" where the word   ('mixture') replaced the old Greek  . The word   (meaning 'something you eat with bread') combined with the suffix  , which was borrowed from the Latin , became 'fish', which after apheresis, synizesis and the loss of final   became the new Greek   and eliminated the Old Greek  , which became an acrostic for Jesus Christ and a symbol for Christianity.

Loanwords from other languages

Especially at the beginning of the Byzantine Empire, Medieval Greek borrowed numerous words from Latin, among them mainly titles and other terms of the imperial court's life like   ('Augustus'),   ('Prince'),   ('Master'),   ('Quaestor'),   ('official').

Other influences on Medieval Greek arose from contact with neighboring languages and the languages of Venetian, Frankish and Arab conquerors. Some of the loanwords from these languages have been permanently retained in Greek or in its dialects:
   from  'stocking'
   from  'dame'
   from  'fur'
   from Albanian lulediell 'sunflower': lule ('flower') +‎ diell ('sun').
   from Arabic: hajji "Mecca pilgrim", used as a name affix for a Christian after a pilgrimage to Jerusalem.

Script
Middle Greek used the 24 letters of the Greek alphabet which, until the end of antiquity, were predominantly used as lapidary and majuscule letters and without a space between words and with diacritics.

Uncial and cursive script

The first Greek script, a cursive script, developed from quick carving into wax tablets with a slate pencil. This cursive script already showed descenders and ascenders, as well as combinations of letters.

In the third century, the Greek uncial developed under the influence of the Latin script because of the need to write on papyrus with a reed pen. In the Middle Ages, uncial became the main script for the Greek language. 

A common feature of the medieval majuscule script like the uncial is an abundance of abbreviations (e.g.  for "Christos") and ligatures. The lunate sigma was adopted in this form as "" in the Cyrillic script. 

The Greek uncial used the interpunct in order to separate sentences for the first time, but there were still no spaces between words.

Minuscule script
The Greek minuscule script, which probably emerged from the cursive writing in Syria, appears more and more frequently from the 9th century onwards. It is the first script that regularly uses accents and spiritus, which had already been developed in the 3rd century BC. This very fluent script, with ascenders and descenders and many possible combinations of letters, is the first to use gaps between words. The last forms which developed in the 12th century were Iota subscript and word-final sigma. The type for Greek majuscules and minuscules that was developed in the 17th century by a printer from the Antwerp printing dynasty, Wetstein, eventually became the norm in modern Greek printing.

Influence on other languages
As the language of the Eastern Orthodox Church, Middle Greek has, especially with the conversion of the Slavs by the brothers Cyril and Methodius, found entrance into the Slavic languages via the religious sector, in particular to the Old Church Slavonic and over its subsequent varieties, the different Church Slavonic manuscripts, also into the language of the countries with an Orthodox population, thus primarily into Bulgarian, Russian, Ukrainian and Serbian, as well as on Romanian, sometimes partly through South Slavic intermediates. For this reason, Greek loanwords and neologisms in these languages often correspond to the Byzantine phonology, while they found their way into the languages of Western Europe over Latin mediation in the sound shape of the classical Greek (cf.  vs.  avtomobil, and the differences in Serbo-Croatian).

Some words in Germanic languages, mainly from the religious context, have also been borrowed from Medieval Greek and have found their way into languages like German or English through the Gothic language. These include the word church (from  'House of the Lord') via Germanic: , and the German word for Pentecost,  (from ‚ 'the fiftieth [day after Easter]').

Byzantine research played an important role in the Greek State, which was refounded in 1832, as the young nation tried to restore its cultural identity through antique and orthodox-medieval traditions. Spyridon Lambros (1851–1919), later Prime Minister of Greece, founded Greek Byzantinology, which was continued by his and Krumbacher's students.

Sample Medieval Greek texts 

The following texts clearly illustrate the case of diglossia in Byzantine Greek, as they date from roughly the same time but show marked differences in terms of grammar and lexicon, and likely in phonology as well. The first selection is an example of high literary classicizing historiography, while the second is a vernacular poem which is more compromising to ordinary speech.

Sample 1 – Anna Komnena 

The first excerpt is from the Alexiad of Anna Komnena, recounting the invasion by Bohemond I of Antioch, son of Robert Guiscard, in 1107. The writer employs much ancient vocabulary, influenced by Herodotean Ionic, though post-classical terminology is also used (e.g. , from ). Anna has a strong command of classical morphology and syntax, but again there are occasional 'errors' reflecting interference from the popular language, such as the use of  + accusative instead of classical  + dative to mean 'in'.

Sample 2 – Digenes Akritas 

The second excerpt is from the epic of Digenes Akritas (manuscript E), possibly dating originally to the 12th century. This text is one of the earliest examples of Byzantine folk literature, and includes many features in line with developments in the demotic language. The poetic metre adheres to the fully developed Greek 15-syllable political verse. Features of popular speech like synezisis, elision and apheresis are regular, as is recognized in the transcription despite the conservative orthography. In morphology, note the use of modern possessive pronouns, the concurrence of classical  and modern  3rd person plural endings, the lack of reduplication in perfect passive participles and the addition of ν to the neuter adjective in γλυκύν. In other parts of the poem, the dative case has been almost completely replaced with the genitive and accusative for indirect objects.

Research
In the Byzantine Empire, Ancient and Medieval Greek texts were copied repeatedly; studying these texts was part of Byzantine education. Several collections of transcriptions tried to record the entire body of Greek literature since antiquity. As there had already been extensive exchange with Italian academics since the 14th century, many scholars and a large number of manuscripts found their way to Italy during the decline of the Eastern Roman Empire. Renaissance Italian and Greek humanists set up important collections in Rome, Florence and Venice. The conveyance of Greek by Greek contemporaries also brought about the itacistic tradition of Greek studies in Italy.

The Greek tradition was also taken to Western and Middle Europe in the 16th century by scholars who had studied at Italian universities. It included Byzantine works that mainly had classical Philology, History and Theology but not Medieval Greek language and literature as their objects of research. Hieronymus Wolf (1516–1580) is said to be the "father" of German Byzantism. In France, the first prominent Byzantist was Charles du Fresne (1610–1688). As the Enlightenment saw in Byzantium mainly the decadent, perishing culture of the last days of the empire, the interest in Byzantine research decreased considerably in the 18th century.

It was not until the 19th century that the publication of and research on Medieval Greek sources began to increase rapidly, which was particularly inspired by Philhellenism. Furthermore, the first texts in vernacular Greek were edited. The branch of Byzantinology gradually split from Classical Philology and became an independent field of research. The Bavarian scholar Karl Krumbacher (1856–1909) carried out research in the newly founded state of Greece, and is considered the founder of Medieval and Modern Greek Philology. From 1897 onwards, he held the academic chair of Medieval and Modern Greek at the University of Munich. In the same century Russian Byzantinology evolved from a former connection between the Orthodox Church and the Byzantine Empire.

Byzantinology also plays a large role in the other countries on the Balkan Peninsula, as Byzantine sources are often very important for the history of each individual people. There is, therefore, a long tradition of research, for example in countries like Serbia, Bulgaria, Romania and Hungary. Further centres of Byzantinology can be found in the United States, Great Britain, France and Italy. Today the two most important centres of Byzantinology in German speaking countries are the Institute for Byzantine Studies, Byzantine Art History and the Institute of Modern Greek Language and Literature at the Ludwig Maximilian University of Munich, and the Institute of Byzantine Studies and of Modern Greek Language and Literature at the University of Vienna. The International Byzantine Association is the umbrella organization for Byzantine Studies and has its head office in Paris.

See also

 Acritic songs
 Bridge of Arta
 Byzantine literature
 Chatalar Inscription
 Frankokratia
 Byzantine Greece
 Omurtag's Tarnovo Inscription
 Ptochoprodromus
 The Dead Brother's Song
 Timarion

Notes

References

Sources

Further reading

External links
 Use of Greek in the Byzantine Empire
 Grammar of Medieval Greek Project (1100–1700), University of Cambridge
 Early Modern Greek blog (mainly in Greek)

 
Languages attested from the 4th century
4th-century establishments
Languages extinct in the 15th century
15th-century disestablishments in Europe
Languages of Egypt
Languages of Sicily
Languages of ancient Italy